Jan Olof Lennart Olsson (pen name Jolo) (31 March 1920 Stockholm, Sweden — 30 April 1974, Hjärnarp, Skåne) was a popular Swedish writer and a journalist for the Swedish newspaper Dagens Nyheter where he elevated the short sketch to an art. He was married to Margareta Sjögren, a journalist at another Swedish newspaper.

Olsson is most known for his books about World War I and World War II,  Den okände soldaten (1965; The Unknown Soldier) and Någonstans i Sverige (1974; Somewhere in Sweden).  He has also written several historical essays and a large number of travel books. Olsson's writing is most notable for his ability to use vivid and picturesque situations to illustrate general patterns.

Bibliography
1954 Drottningens England 
1956 Årsklass 39 
1957 Irland, den omöjliga ön 
1958 Chicago
1960 Leningrad, S:t Petersburg
1961 Och deras fall blev stort!
1961 Det glada Stockholm
1962 Amerikafeber
1963 Mittåt
1964 1914 
1966 Ner till Bosporen 
1966 Drottningens England
1967 De tre från Haparanda
1968 Plogen och stjärnorna
1968 I Dublins vackra stad
1969 Slipsen i Krakow
1970 Generaler och likställda
1970 Mord och sol och vår
1971 Lågtryck över Irland
1973 De tre mot Petrograd
1974 Någonstans i Sverige

References

External links
Works by Jan Olof Olsson in the Swedish National Library Catalogue

1920 births
1974 deaths
Writers from Stockholm
Swedish political writers
20th-century travel writers
Swedish travel writers
Swedish-language writers
20th-century Swedish journalists